The 2020 IIHF Women's U18 World Championship was the 13th Women's U18 World Championship in ice hockey.

Top Division

Match officials
9 referees and 9 linesmen were selected for the tournament.

Referees
 Henna Åberg
 Darya Abrosimova
 Gabrielle Ariano-Lortie
 Kelly Cooke
 Drahomíra Fialova
 Elena Ivanova
 Gabriela Malá
 Vanessa Morin
 Svenja Strohmenger

Linesmen
 Liv Andersson
 Magdaléna Čerhitová
 Stephanie Cole
 Polina Danilova
 Marine Dinant
 Kendall Hanley
 Amy Lack
 Justine Todd
 Wang Hui

Preliminary round
All times are local (UTC+1).

Group A

Group B

Relegation round
The third and fourth placed team from Group B played a best-of-three series to determine the relegated team.

Final round
Teams were reseeded for the semifinals in accordance with the following ranking:

tier of the group;
position in the group.

Bracket

Quarterfinals

Semifinals

Fifth place game

Bronze medal game

Gold medal game

Final ranking

Statistics

Scoring leaders

GP = Games played; G = Goals; A = Assists; Pts = Points; +/− = Plus-minus; PIM = Penalties In MinutesSource: IIHF

Goaltending leaders
(minimum 40% team's total ice time)

TOI = Time on ice (minutes:seconds); GA = Goals against; GAA = Goals against average; SA = Shots against; Sv% = Save percentage; SO = ShutoutsSource: IIHF

Awards
Best players selected by the Directorate:
Best Goaltender:  Anna Alpatova
Best Defenceman:  Nelli Laitinen
Best Forward:  Kristi Shashkina
Source: IIHF

Media All-Stars:
MVP:  Kristi Shashkina
Goaltender:  Anna Alpatova
Defencemen:  Sanni Rantala /  Kendall Cooper
Forwards:  Lacey Eden /  Laura Zimmermann /  Jenna Buglioni
Source: IIHF

Division I

Group A
The tournament was held in Füssen, Germany from 3 to 9 January 2020.

Group B
The tournament was held in Katowice, Poland from 2 to 8 January 2020.

Division II

Group A
The tournament was held in Eindhoven, Netherlands from 25 to 28 January 2020.

Group B
The tournament was held in Mexico City, Mexico from 28 January to 2 February 2020.

Finals Bracket

References

External links
Official website

IIHF World Women's U18 Championships
2019–20 in women's ice hockey
IIHF
IIHF
IIHF
International ice hockey competitions hosted by Slovakia
Sports competitions in Bratislava